Chester Merle "Chet" Blaylock (November 13, 1924 – October 23, 1996)  was a U.S. politician born in Joliet, Montana. Blaylock served in the U.S. Navy during World War II. Later he was a teacher for 30 years in Laurel and Chinook, Montana. He was a delegate to the Montana state Constitutional Convention in 1972 and a member of the Montana State Senate from Laurel, Montana. In 1996 Blaylock was the Democratic nominee for Governor of Montana against incumbent Marc Racicot. On the way to a debate with his opponent less than two weeks before the election, Blaylock died of a heart attack at Deer Lodge, Montana. His running mate, Judy Jacobson, continued unsuccessfully with his campaign. Blaylock was cremated and his ashes interred at Rockvale Cemetery in Rockvale, Montana.

State Record of Passing
On April 6, 1997, Fifty-fifth Legislative Assembly of the State of Montana officially recognized in the Senate Journal the passing of Chet Blaylock:

" WHEREAS, it is with deep and sincere sorrow that the members of the Senate of the Fifty-fifth Legislative Assembly of the State of Montana record the passing of Chet Blaylock on October 23, 1996.
WHEREAS, it is fitting and proper that the record and accomplishments of the late Senator Blaylock be filed on the official records of this Assembly and the following facts relative to his career are hereby noted:
Chet Blaylock was an educator. He believed that every Montana child was entitled to a free, quality education, a livable environment, a good job and affordable health care. He a spent a lifetime pursuing that objective.
Born in Joliet November 13, 1924, he served in the Navy, earning four medals in the South Pacific, and returned to enter Eastern Montana College and later the University of Montana where he received B.S. and Master's degrees. He was chairman of the State Democratic Party and a delegate to the Montana Constitutional Convention. He was elected to the State Senate in 1974 and served continuously from 1975 to 1993. His last political campaign as the Democratic candidate for Governor of Montana, ended with his death on October 23, 1996.
Senator Blaylock is survived by his widow, Mildred, and five children."

Chet Blaylock Memorial Scholarship Award
Offered at MSU-Billings, the Chet Blaylock Memorial Scholarship Award is a scholarship of $600. Recipients must be a full-time student enrolled for a minimum of 15 credits per semester; a graduate of a Montana high school; a Montana resident; have a high school GPA of 3.5 or above, university GPA of 3.25 or above; two letters of recommendation; and must be a student who shows "promise in a chosen field".

A large banner in Helena High School reads the quote: “Courage and gold are both rare; but courage, unlike gold, is seldom sought after.”—Chet Blaylock

References

External links
NY Times archive on Blaylock passing
Chet Blaylock Memorial Scholarship Award
Record of time of a conversation between Blaylock and President Jimmy Carter, 1980

1924 births
1996 deaths
20th-century American educators
20th-century American politicians
United States Navy personnel of World War II
Schoolteachers from Montana
Military personnel from Montana
Democratic Party Montana state senators
Montana State University Billings alumni
People from Carbon County, Montana
People from Chinook, Montana
People from Yellowstone County, Montana
University of Montana alumni